Luigi Pascale (1923 – 14 March 2017) was an Italian engineer designer of light aircraft.  He was the founder of the aircraft manufacturers Partenavia and Tecnam, the latter a company he started with his brother Giovanni.

Biography
Luigi "Gino" Pascale was born in Naples, Italy in 1923. He teamed with his brother Giovanni to design and construct several light aircraft. The first completed design was the Partenavia Astore in 1948.

In 1951 Pascale received a Master's degree in Mechanical Engineering, after which he became an instructor at Naples University. He was elevated to rank of Professor by 1957, when he founded the Italian aircraft design/manufacturing firm Partenavia.

In 1986 the two Pascale brothers founded the Italian aircraft design/manufacturing firm Tecnam.

Pascale died on 14 March 2017 in his house in Naples, aged 93.

Designs
Partenavia P.68
Partenavia Oscar
Partenavia Astore
Tecnam P2006T
Tecnam P92
Tecnam P2012 Traveller

References

Sources

1923 births
2017 deaths
Academic staff of the University of Naples Federico II
Engineers from Naples
Aircraft designers